Jemima Shore at the Sunny Grave And Other Stories is a book by Antonia Fraser. First published in 1991, it is a collection of nine short stories, featuring series character Jemima Shore. It includes such settings as the Caribbean and the Mediterranean. The book includes murderous drama, black comedy, and a maniacal rapist.

1991 short story collections
British short story collections
Crime short story collections
Works by Antonia Fraser
Bloomsbury Publishing books